Hunt Field  is a city-owned, public-use airport located one nautical mile (2 km) south of the central business district of Lander, a city in Fremont County, Wyoming, United States. It is included in the National Plan of Integrated Airport Systems for 2011–2015, which categorized it as a general aviation facility.

Facilities and aircraft 
Hunt Field covers an area of 135 acres (55 ha) at an elevation of 5,587 feet (1,703 m) above mean sea level. It has one runway designated 3/21 with an asphalt surface measuring 5,007 by 100 feet (1,526 x 30 m). It also has one helipad designated H1 with an asphalt surface measuring 40 by 40 feet (12 x 12 m).

For the 12-month period ending May 31, 2018, the airport had 11,130 aircraft operations, an average of 30 per day: 99% general aviation, 1% air taxi, and <1% military. At that time there were 47 aircraft based at this airport: 85% single-engine, 10% multi-engine, 2% jet, and 2% helicopter, plus 1 ultralight.

References

External links 
 Aerial image as of August 1994 from USGS The National Map

Airports in Wyoming
Transportation in Fremont County, Wyoming